Solo II is the twelfth album by the Portuguese music composer António Pinho Vargas. It was released in 2009. It was later presented with the José Afonso 2010 award.

Track listing

Personnel
 António Pinho Vargas - piano

References

António Pinho Vargas albums
2009 albums